50th parallel may refer to:

50th parallel north, a circle of latitude in the Northern Hemisphere
50th parallel south, a circle of latitude in the Southern Hemisphere